Inukonda Thirumali, or Acharya Thirumali is an Indian historian, and was an activist for separate statehood for Telangana. He is the chairman of Joint Action Committee of Telangana Praja Sanghalu.

Early life
I Thirumali did his M.A. in history at Osmania University, M.Phil on Agrarian Relations of Telangana and Ph.D. on Telangana Peasant Movement, both from Centre for Historical Studies, Jawaharlal Nehru University.

Career
I. Thirumali is a Reader, Department of History Sri Venkateswara College at Delhi University. He has authored books on Telangana and feudalism in Telangana.

He is the Vice-president of Telangana Intellectuals Forum, Hyderabad.

Books by Inukonda Thirumali
 Against Dora And Nizam: Peoples Movement In Telangana 1939-1948
 Marriage, Love And Caste : Perceptions On Telugu Women During The Colonial Period 
 South India Regions, Cultures And Sagas
 Repressed Discourses: Essays In Honour Of Prof. Sabyasachi Bhattacharya

Research papers
 Dora and Gadi: Manifestation of Landlord Domination in Telangana
 Peasant Class Assertions in Nalgonda and Warangal Districts of Telangana, 1930-1946 - Indian Economic and Social History Review, 31, no 2 (1994)

References

External links
 Profile on SV College, Delhi University

Activists from Telangana
Living people
Year of birth missing (living people)